Draco formosus, the dusky gliding lizard, is a species of agamid lizard. It is found in Thailand and Malaysia.

References

Draco (genus)
Reptiles of Thailand
Reptiles of Malaysia
Reptiles described in 1900
Taxa named by George Albert Boulenger